Convivium Records is a British independent record label and record self-releasing house established by Adrian Green in 2010.

The label records, masters, markets and distributes choral and instrumental music by predominantly British, European and American artists, composers and ensembles. An in-house recording choir, the Convivium Singers, provides support for larger force vocal recordings.

The label has produced albums with choirs including Sansara, Sofia Vokalensemble, Ars Nova, Winchester College Chapel Choir, Portsmouth Grammar School Chamber Choir, Portsmouth Cathedral Choir, the Hogan Ensemble. The label has recorded with many ensembles, including the London Mozart Players, Florisma, Fidelio Trio & the English Cornett and Sackbut Ensemble. The label has worked with artists, including pianist Jonathan Powell, countertenor James Bowman, soprano Penelope Appleyard, organist Sebastian Thomson, and by contemporary American and British composers, Carson Cooman, Dan Locklair, June Clark, David Price, Thomas Hewitt Jones, John White, Rob Keeley and Hugh Benham.

Artist Roster 
Accurate (not exhaustive!) with respect to Convivium Records' website as of 13 September 2017.
 John White 
 Jonathan Powell 
 Sansara 
 Winchester College Chapel Choir 
 English Cornett and Sackbut Ensemble 
 London Mozart Players 
 Hogan Ensemble
 Malcolm Archer
 Joe Waggott
 Apollo Baroque Consort
 Portsmouth Cathedral Choir
 Hugh Benham
 The School of Economic Science's Discantvs Choir 
 Rob Keeley
 Convivium Singers 
 Neil Ferris
 Fidelio Trio 
 Rowland Sutherland
 James Bowman

See also 
 List of record labels
 List of independent UK record labels

References

External links
 Official site

British independent record labels